WVHV-LP is a Variety formatted broadcast radio station licensed to and serving Harrisville, West Virginia.  WVHV-LP is owned and operated by Ritchie Progress Alliance, Inc.

References

External links
 

2014 establishments in West Virginia
Variety radio stations in the United States
Radio stations established in 2014
VHV-LP
VHV-LP